Samuel J. Meisels is an American academic in the areas  of early childhood assessment, child development and educational practices that support the developmental needs of young children.

Meisels is the founding executive director of the Buffett Early Childhood Institute at the University of Nebraska, president emeritus of Erikson Institute, and a professor and research scientist emeritus at the University of Michigan. Meisels retired from the Buffett Institute on Feb. 28, 2023, capping off a career that has spanned a half-century and established him as a leading voice in the field of early childhood education. 

In 2010 Meisels received an honorary degree of Doctor of Humane Letters from Roosevelt University and in 2019 the Simms/Mann Institute awarded Meisels its Visionary Leadership Award in Development and Education.

Education

Meisels received his bachelor's degree with high honors in philosophy from the University of Rochester in 1967  and then enrolled in a master's and doctoral program at Harvard University in education and philosophy. While at Harvard Meisels began studying the work of Jean Piaget, whose ideas about children and epistemology motivated him to become a teacher of preschool, kindergarten, and first grade. Meisels completed his doctoral studies at the Harvard Graduate School of Education in 1973.

Professional Positions
In 1972 Meisels accepted a position as a faculty member at Tufts University and, from 1973-1978, was director of the Eliot-Pearson Children's School, the laboratory school of the Department of Child Study. From 1979-1980 he served as Senior Advisor in Early Childhood Development in the Developmental Evaluation Clinic of Children's Hospital Medical Center at Boston before joining the faculty of the University of Michigan in the fall of 1980.

During his 21 years at Michigan, Meisels held several positions including that of research scientist and acting director at the Center for Human Growth and Development, and professor, interim dean, and associate dean of research in the School of Education. In 2002 Meisels became the president of Erikson Institute. In June 2013 Meisels was appointed the founding executive director of the Buffett Early Childhood Institute, where he is also a professor of child, youth, and family studies at the University of Nebraska-Lincoln and holds courtesy appointments on the other university campuses as a professor of public health, public administration, and education.

Contributions to Research and Assessment

Meisels’s earliest work demonstrated his interest in theory-based instructional approaches in early childhood classrooms. Over his career he published more than 200 books, articles, assessments, and monographs. His research focused on developmental screening, inclusion of young children with special needs in regular educational programs, developmental consequences of high-risk birth, school readiness, and performance assessment of young children. In addition to developing and researching early childhood assessments, Meisels prepared activity books for parents and co-edited two handbooks for the field. He has served on numerous editorial boards as a reviewer and editor.

Meisels has long been committed to fairness, accuracy, utility, and developmental principles in assessment of children. He has written extensively about the use of alternative assessment strategies that are authentic, performance-based, and developmentally appropriate for young children and those in the early elementary grades and he co-authored three widely-used early childhood assessments.

The Early Screening Inventory 
In 1975 Meisels and his colleagues began work on a brief developmental screening instrument designed to identify children, aged 3–6, who were at risk for learning and behavior problems. Known as the Early Screening Inventory (ESI-3), this well-researched, nationally validated screening instrument identifies children who can benefit from early intervention services. It is one of the most reliable and carefully developed early childhood screening instruments available and is currently in its third edition.

The Work Sampling System

The Work Sampling System (WSS) is an observational assessment for children from preschool (age 3) - Grade 3. Constructivist in orientation, WSS gives teachers a unique perspective on children's learning and development that differs sharply from conventional outcomes available from standardized achievement tests. The three times per year developmental observations recorded with WSS enable teachers to document what children are learning in relation to standards of progress they are showing and children's specific strengths and areas in need of development.

The Work Sampling System has been used throughout the United States and internationally for more than three decades. Currently in its fifth edition, WSS has undergone extensive validation, and was the subject of a number of peer-reviewed empirical studies that document its validity.

The Ounce Scale

Meisels and colleagues also published the Ounce Scale: An Observational Assessment for Infants, Toddlers, and Families, an authentic performance assessment that is used with children from infancy through age three. Notable is the Ounce Scale's focus on the social and emotional development of infants and toddlers and the involvement of families in this assessment.

Erikson Institute 
Meisels served as president of Erikson Institute, a graduate school in child development, from 2002-2013. Under Meisels's leadership, Erikson grew into a source of research, community partnerships, and graduate programs, all of which continually evolved to meet the needs of the early childhood field.

Meisels expanded institute funding for applied research and community-based projects; creating new partnerships with public school teachers, administrators, and students through the New Schools Project, Early Math Collaborative, and Herr Research Center for Children and Social Policy; establishing a comprehensive clinical assessment and counseling center for at-risk children and families; and completing a successful five-year fundraising campaign to build a new campus and support an endowed chair, fellowships, and special programs.

Buffett Early Childhood Institute 
Meisels was appointed the founding Executive Director of the Buffett Early Childhood Institute  in June 2013. The Institute was created in order to raise early childhood to a university priority.

Under Meisels, the Institute developed programs to close the achievement and opportunity gap for vulnerable young children, and to prepare a workforce to care for young children from birth through Grade 3. The issues raised by these programs involve multiple systems of care, training, public policy, and funding, as well as research and evaluation.

In 2017 the university named Meisels to the Richard D. Holland Presidential Chair in Early Childhood Development, the highest honor the university can confer on a faculty member.

References

1945 births
University of Rochester alumni
University of Michigan faculty
Living people
Harvard Graduate School of Education alumni